Ophiussa, also spelled Ophiusa, is the ancient name given by the ancient Greeks to what is now Portuguese territory near the mouth of the river Tagus. It means Land of Serpents.

The expulsion of the Oestrimni 
The 4th century Roman poet Rufius Festus Avienius, writing on geographical subjects in Ora Maritima ("Seacoasts"), a document inspired by a Greek mariners' Periplus, related that the Oestriminis (Extreme West in Latin) was peopled by the Oestrimni, a people who had been living there for a long time; they had to flee their homeland after an invasion of serpents. These people could be linked to the Saephe (Saefs) or Ophis ("People of the Serpents") and the Dragani ("People of the Dragons"), who came to those lands and built the territorial entity the Greeks termed Ophiussa.

The expulsion of the Oestrimni,  from Ora Maritima:

The "serpent people" of the semi-mythical Ophiussa in the far west are noted in ancient Greek sources.

Land of the Ophi
The Ophi people lived mainly in the inland mountains of Northern Portugal (and Galicia). Others say they lived mainly by the estuaries of the rivers Douro and Tagus. The Ophi worshiped serpents, hence Land of Serpents. There have surfaced a few archeological findings that could be related to this people or culture. Some believe that the dragon sometimes represented as a griffin, from the original Winged Serpent, or Wyvern (the traditional Portuguese Serpe Real), old crest of the crown of the Kings of Portugal and later of the Emperors of Brazil, is linked to local people or to the Celts who later invaded the area and could also have been influenced by the Ophi cult.

Ophi legend
A legend relates that on the summer solstice a maiden-serpent, a chthonic goddess, reveals hidden treasures to people journeying through forests. This maiden would live in the city of Porto.  Festivities related to this goddess occurred during the solstice. During the rest of the year, she would change into a snake living under or among rocks, and shepherds would set aside some milk from their flocks as an offering to her.

See also
Avienius
Cuco
History of Portugal
Lusitania
Lusitanian mythology
Sepharad
Timeline of Portuguese history

Notes

External links
Ora Maritima (in Latin) at The Latin Library
Culto a la serpiente en el mundo Antiguo Serpent cult in the Ancient Word (in Spanish)
Detailed map of the Pre-Roman Peoples of Iberia (around 200 BC)

Ancient Portugal
Lusitanian mythology